Emil Nygaard Vinjebo (born 24 March 1994) is a Danish cyclist, who currently rides for UCI Continental team .

Major results

2011
 5th Overall Regio-Tour
 9th Overall Liège–La Gleize
2012
 1st Stage 1 (TTT) Regio-Tour
 4th Overall Tour du Pays de Vaud
 10th Overall Grand Prix Rüebliland
2016
 4th Paris–Chauny
 6th GP Viborg
 9th Gran Premio Sportivi di Poggiana
2017
 2nd Overall Okolo Jižních Čech
2018
 2nd Overall Tour du Loir-et-Cher
1st Stage 4
 2nd Himmerland Rundt
 2nd Duo Normand (with Casper von Folsach)
 4th Lillehammer GP
 5th Gylne Gutuer
 6th Overall Tour of Denmark
 6th Hafjell GP
 7th Overall Tour de Normandie
 10th GP Horsens
2019
 3rd Tro-Bro Léon
 4th La Drôme Classic
 4th Fyen Rundt

References

External links

1994 births
Living people
Danish male cyclists
People from Roskilde Municipality
Sportspeople from Region Zealand